Brian Maxwell Simmers (born 26 February 1940, Glasgow) is a former Scotland international rugby union player.

Rugby Union career

Amateur career

He played for Glasgow Academicals.

Provincial career

He played for Glasgow District in the Scottish Inter-District Championship.

International career

Family

He was the son of Bill "Max" Simmers, who was also capped for Scotland. and tennis player Gwen Sterry. His grandmother was Charlotte Cooper who won five women's singles titles at the Wimbledon Championships and two gold medals at the 1900 Summer Olympics.

References

Sources

 Bath, Richard (ed.) The Scotland Rugby Miscellany (Vision Sports Publishing Ltd, 2007 )

1940 births
Living people
Scottish rugby union players
Scotland international rugby union players
Rugby union players from Glasgow
Glasgow Academicals rugby union players
Glasgow District (rugby union) players
Rugby union centres